1945–46 was the thirty-third occasion on which the Lancashire Cup completion had been held, and the first since the end of the Second World War in Europe.
For the first time for several seasons there is a new name on the trophy; that of one of the founder members of the Northern Union, Widnes, who won the trophy by beating Wigan by the score of 7-3.
The match was played at Wilderspool, Warrington, (historically in the county of Lancashire). The attendance was 28,184 and receipts were £2,600.

Background 

The number of teams entering showed little change from before the war.
St Helens Recs had already withdrawn from the league immediately after the end on the 1938-39 season. The club had been struggling to survive for a few years with falling attendances and the economic depression and it was obviously not possible for the town to sustain two top teams.
Leigh lost its ground to in August 1940 when Callender's Cable and Construction Company bought the Mather Lane site to store drums etc as part of the war effort. The club did not resume playing until the 1946–47 season when they found a temporary ground.
Workington Town from Cumberland had joined the league.
Overall, the number of teams entering this year’s competition had decreased from the pre-war total by just one and was now 12. The same pre-war fixture format was retained. This season saw no byes but two “blank” or “dummy” fixture in the first round. The second round now had two byes. 
The first round of the competition was played on the basis of two legged, home and away, ties.

Competition and results

Round 1  
Involved  6 matches (with two “blank” fixture) and 12 clubs

Round 1 – second leg 
Involved 6 matches (with two “blank” fixture) and 12 clubs. These are the reverse fixture from the first leg

Round 2 - quarterfinals 
Involved 2 matches (with two byes) and 6 clubs

Round 3 – semifinals  
Involved 2 matches and 4 clubs

Final

Teams and scorers 

Scoring - Try = three (3) points - Goal = two (2) points - Drop goal = two (2) points

The road to success 
All the first round ties were played on a two leg (home and away) basis
The first club named in each of the first round ties played the first leg at home
the scores shown in the first round are the aggregate score over the two legs

1 * The first match in the Lancashire Cup competition to be played by the new club and at this ground (of Workington AFC)
2 * Wilderspool was the home ground of Warrington from 1883 to the end of the 2003 Summer season when they moved into the new purpose built Halliwell Jones Stadium. Wilderspool remained as a sports/Ruugby League ground and is/was used by Woolston Rovers/Warrington Wizards junior club. 
The ground had a final capacity of 9,000 although the record attendance was set in a Challenge cup third round match on 13 March 1948 when 34,304 spectators saw Warrington lose to Wigan 10-13.

See also 
1945–46 Northern Rugby Football League season
Rugby league county cups

References

External links
Saints Heritage Society
1896–97 Northern Rugby Football Union season at wigan.rlfans.com
Hull&Proud Fixtures & Results 1896/1897
Widnes Vikings - One team, one passion Season In Review - 1896-97
The Northern Union at warringtonwolves.org

1945 in English rugby league
RFL Lancashire Cup